Kaveinga lusca is a species of ground beetle in the subfamily Rhysodinae. It was described by Louis Alexandre Auguste Chevrolat in 1875.

References

Kaveinga
Beetles described in 1875